Hennild Wollstadmo (born 24 July 1943) is a Norwegian politician for the Centre Party.

She served as a deputy representative to the Norwegian Parliament from Nordland during the term 1981–1985. In total she met during 3 days of parliamentary session.

References

1943 births
Living people
Centre Party (Norway) politicians
Deputy members of the Storting
Nordland politicians
Place of birth missing (living people)
20th-century Norwegian women politicians
20th-century Norwegian politicians
Women members of the Storting